Mount Eastman is a mountain overlooking the head of Flandres Bay,  south of Pelletan Point on the west coast of Graham Land. It was charted by the Belgian Antarctic Expedition of 1897–99 under Gerlache. It was named by the UK Antarctic Place-Names Committee in 1960 for photographic innovator George Eastman.

References 

Mountains of Graham Land
Graham Coast